Obesotoma laevigata is a species of sea snail, a marine gastropod mollusk in the family Mangeliidae.

Description
The length of the shell varies between 6 mm and 20 mm.

(Original description) The short, stout shell consists of four or five robust whorls. These are smooth, or with excessively fine revolving lines. The spire is short, usually one third or less of the total length, but varying somewhat. The suture is distinct but not channelled. The whorls are not turreted. The apex is rather obtuse. The protoconch is minute, whitish, smooth and consists of 1½ whorl . The wide aperture is about two-thirds as long as the shell. The outer lip is effuse. The sutural sinus is more or less marked. The wide siphonal canal is short and straight. The exterior is sometimes marked with rather rugged lines of growth, or is quite smooth, but not polished. The color of the shell is livid purple, with a superficial wash of white, a solid white line below the suture. The anterior extremity of the columella is white. The callus is evident but not conspicuous.

This very peculiar little shell is of a solid and rugged aspect, even living specimens looking as if beach-worn and dead. It varies in the roundness of the whorls and the elevation of the spire. Living specimens sometimes present no revolving lines, while others show excessively fine ones.

Distribution
This marine species occurs off Greenland, Iceland and in the Western Mediterranean Sea.

References

 Middendorff T. A. von, 1849 : Beiträge zur einer Malacozoologica Rossica, II. Aufzählung und Beschreibung der zur Meeresfauna Russlands gehörigen Einschaler ; Mémoires de l'Académie Impériale des Sciences de St-Petersbourg (6) 8 (Sciences naturelles, 6): 329–610
 Bogdanov I.P., 1990 : Mollusca, Vol.5, No.3: The mollusk subfamily Oenopotinae (Gastropoda, Pectinibranchia, Turridae) of the USSR seas ; Fauna of the USSR New Series, No. 142. 223 p [in Russian]

External links
  Tucker, J.K. 2004 Catalog of recent and fossil turrids (Mollusca: Gastropoda). Zootaxa 682:1–1295.

laevigata
Gastropods described in 1871